Gare is a village located in the municipality of Preševo, Serbia. According to the 2002 census, the village had a population of 110 people, all Albanians. According to the 2002 census, the village was without inhabitants.

References

Populated places in Pčinja District
Albanian communities in Serbia